Grahovo is a village in the municipality of Rožaje, Montenegro.

Demographics
According to the 2011 census, its population was 295.

References

Populated places in Rožaje Municipality